The Vivekananda International Foundation (VIF) is an Indian public policy think-tank. It is considered to be aligned to right-of-centre in its policies.

Origins and history  
The Vivekananda International Foundation describes itself as an "independent, non-partisan institution that promotes quality research and in-depth studies." The Foundation was established in December 2009, at a site in New Delhi's Chanakyapuri allotted by the P. V. Narasimha Rao government in 1993. Ajit Doval, who retired as the director of the Intelligence Bureau in 2005, became its founder Director. The Foundation made news in 2011–2012 when it was said to be instrumental in bringing together Anna Hazare, Arvind Kejriwal and Kiran Bedi, along with Baba Ramdev, to form the 'Team Anna'.

In 2014, its director Ajit Doval was appointed by the Prime Minister Narendra Modi as India's National Security Advisor. The Prime Minister's Principal Secretary Nripendra Misra and the Additional Principal Secretary P. K.  Mishra were also recruited from the Foundation's staff. The Prime Minister Modi is said to have been following the Foundation for some time and is impressed with its work.

The Foundation states that it has no formal organisational links with the RSS or the Bharatiya Janata Party. However, commentators have found Hindu nationalist ideas in several of its publications. The news magazine Tehelka has claimed that the Foundation supplied the intellectual inputs for the Narendra Modi campaign, defended him against charges in the Ishrat Jahan case, and spearheaded the Anna Hazare anti-corruption movement to undercut the United Progressive Alliance government.

Output
The Foundation's primary output ranges from short articles and reports published online to monographs and occasional papers and a quarterly journal called National Security. In addition, the Foundation also holds regular seminars and a monthly discourse on contemporary subjects titled Vimarsh. The think tank has also worked with other think tanks on joint reports. A monthly magazine Vivek is brought out too.

VIF Key members 
VIF is currently headed by former Deputy NSA of India Arvind Gupta. S. Gurumurthy is the chairman, and former Deputy NSA and former head of National Security Council, Satish Chandra is the vice-chairman of the think tank.

Many retired officers from Defence Forces/ Bureaucracy form the think resource. The members regularly meet to discuss upon subject, ranging from prevailing political,  strategical and other administrative issues  with an aim of resource development and promote nationalism.

See also
List of think tanks in India
Observer Research Foundation

References

Conservatism in India 
Anti-communist organizations
Anti-communism in India 
Right-wing politics in India 
Neoliberal organizations 
Organisations based in Delhi
2009 establishments in India
Political and economic think tanks 
Foreign policy and strategy think tanks in India